Hugo Ernesto Gottardi (born July 31, 1953 in Elortondo, Santa Fe, Argentina) is a former Argentine football player and coach.

Playing career
Gottardi made his mark as a striker, first with Racing Club de Avellaneda and then with Estudiantes de La Plata, where he scored most of his goals, as top scorer of the team that won back-to-back championship titles Metropolitano 1982 and Nacional 1983. Gottardi became one of the Argentine league top scorers.

Following his successful stint with Estudiantes, Gottardi was transferred to Independiente de Santa Fe of Colombia in 1983, where he played until 1986, winning two times the prize ("Botín de Oro" ) as top scorer in the league (1983 and 1984). In Colombia he received the nickname "terremoto" (Earthquake) by Independiente Santa fe fans.

Gottardi returned to Argentina in 1987 to play for Talleres de Córdoba and then Lanús between 1988 and his retirement in 1989.

After retirement, Gottardi became part of Miguel Angel Russo's coaching team. They obtained the 2005 Clausura title with Vélez Sársfield. In December 2006, Gottardi joined Boca Juniors as Russo's assistant coach, winning the 2007 Copa Libertadores.

Titles as a player

Coaching career
After retirement, Gottardi became part of Miguel Angel Russo's coaching team. They obtained the 2005 Clausura title with Vélez Sársfield. In December 2006, Gottardi joined Boca Juniors as Russo's assistant coach, winning the 2007 Copa Toyota Libertadores.

External links
Hugo Gottardi at BDFA.com.ar 

1953 births
Living people
Argentine footballers
Argentine people of Italian descent
Association football forwards
Argentine Primera División players
Categoría Primera A players
Racing Club de Avellaneda footballers
Quilmes Atlético Club footballers
Estudiantes de La Plata footballers
Independiente Santa Fe footballers
Talleres de Córdoba footballers
Club Atlético Lanús footballers
Argentine expatriate footballers
Expatriate footballers in Colombia
People from General López Department
Talleres de Remedios de Escalada managers
Argentine football managers
Sportspeople from Santa Fe Province